Newcombia sulcata is a species of tropical tree-living air-breathing land snail, arboreal pulmonate gastropod mollusk in the family Achatinellidae. This species is endemic to the United States.

References

Newcombia
Biota of Molokai
Molluscs of Hawaii
Endemic fauna of Hawaii
Critically endangered fauna of Hawaii
Gastropods described in 1857
Taxonomy articles created by Polbot